National Tertiary Route 334, or just Route 334 (or ) is a National Road Route of Costa Rica, located in the San José province.

Description
In San José province the route covers Pérez Zeledón canton (San Isidro de El General, Daniel Flores districts).

References

Highways in Costa Rica